Cannabis is illegal in Saint Martin for personal use. Limited types of cannabis-derived products are permitted for medical uses. As an overseas collectivity of France, Saint Martin is subject to French law and all international conventions signed by France.

See also
 Cannabis in France
 Hemp in France

References

Saint Martin
Cannabis in the Caribbean
Cannabis in Latin America